Colección and variants may refer to:

Art
Colección Júmex

Music
Colección (Roy Brown album), compilation album
La Colección (Master Joe and O.G. Black album), compilation album
La Colección (Lucero album) Melody Records 1990
La Colección, compilation album by Alejandra Guzman Melody Records 1990
La Colección, compilation album by Menudo (band) 1990
Colección Privada, compilation album by Mónica Naranjo
Colección Definitiva, compilation album by Alejandro Sanz
Colección Romantica Juan Luis Guerra
La Mejor... Colección Marco Antonio Solís 2007 
La Más Completa Colección (Marco Antonio Solís album)
La Más Completa Colección (Jenni Rivera album)

See also
De Colección (disambiguation)
20 De Colección (disambiguation)